David N. Bivin (born July 20, 1939, in Cleveland, Oklahoma) is an Israeli-American biblical scholar, member of the Jerusalem School of Synoptic Research. His role at the Jerusalem School involves publishing the journal Jerusalem Perspective and organizing seminars.

Career

Jerusalem Perspective 
Along with Jeffrey Magnuson, Bivin founded Jerusalem Perspective in 1987 as a monthly, four-page newsletter. Later it became a quarterly, forty-page, full-color magazine. From 1987-1999, Jerusalem Perspective published fifty-six print issues, after which it transitioned to an online-only distribution format. Bivin serves as its publisher and editor.

Methodology

Bivin's work sometimes involves taking a Greek phrase from the Bible, attempting to uncover what the underlying Hebrew idiom would have been, and then translating and interpreting the idiom, in other words relating a Greek text to its Hebrew equivalent, then translating it to English.

Family

David Bivin immigrated to Israel in 1963. Bivin served as a sergeant in an Israeli army reserve infantry unit from 1974 to 1991. He and his wife currently reside in a suburb of Jerusalem, Israel.

Works

Books

Chapters

Journals edited
 Jerusalem perspective Online. Jerusalem, Israel: David Bivin, 1999-now.
 Jerusalem perspective : a monthly report on research into the words of Jesus. Jerusalem, Israel: David Bivin, 1987-1999.

See also
Jerusalem school hypothesis
Robert Lisle Lindsey

References

External links 
 Biography

1939 births
Living people
People from Cleveland, Oklahoma
American biblical scholars
Christian writers
Israeli biblical scholars